Best Friend or Best Friends may refer to:

 Someone with whom one shares the strongest type of friendship.

Film and television
 Best Friend (film), a 2020 South Korean film
 Best Friends (1982 film), a film starring Goldie Hawn and Burt Reynolds
 Best Friends (1975 film), a film by Noel Nosseck
 Best Friends, a Telugu film by Sunil Kumar Reddy
Best F(r)iends, a film starring Tommy Wiseau and Greg Sestero
"Best Friends", a Thomas & Friends season 12 episode

Literature
 Best Friends (Martin novel), part of the Main Street book series
 Best Friends (Wilson novel), a children's novel by Jacqueline Wilson
 Best Friends, a 2003 novel by Thomas Berger

Music

Albums
 Best Friends (Cleo Laine and John Williams album) (1978)
 Best Friend (Edmond Leung album) (1997)
 Best Friend (Hillsong United album) (2000)
 Best Friends?, a 2010 album by Brad

Songs
 "Best Friend" (50 Cent song) (2005)
 "Best Friend" (Brandy song) (1994)
 "Best Friend" (Foster the People song) (2014)
 "Best Friend" (Kana Nishino song) (2010)
 "Best Friend" (Saweetie song) (2021)
 "Best Friend" (Sofi Tukker song) (2017)
 "Best Friend" (The Beat song) (1980)
 "Best Friend" (Toy-Box song) (1999)
 "Best Friend" (Yelawolf song) (2015)
 "Best Friend" (Young Thug song) (2015)
 "Best Friend", by Candlebox from Lucy (1995)
 "Best Friend", by The Drums from the self-titled album (2010)
 "Best Friend", by Helen Reddy from I Don't Know How to Love Him (1971)
 "Best Friend", by Johnny Cash from Any Old Wind That Blows (1973)
 "Best Friend", by Madonna from MDNA (2012)
 "Best Friend", by Paul McCartney & Wings from Red Rose Speedway (1973)
 "Best Friend", by Toni Braxton from the eponymous album (1993)
 "Best Friend (The Unicorn song)", by Margie Adam from Margie Adam. Songwriter (1976)
 "Best Friend", by iKON from Return (2018)
 "Best Friend", by Jason Chen
 "Best Friend", by Rex Orange County
 “Best Friends” a song by 5 Seconds Of Summer from 5SOS5
 "Best Friends" (Froggy Fresh song) (2012)
"Best Friends" (Sophia Grace song) (2014)
 "Best Friends", by Ron Sexsmith from Cobblestone Runway (2002)
 "Best Friends" by Allstars (band) (2002)
 "Best Friends", by The Weeknd from Dawn FM (2022)

Other uses
 Best Friend (play), a 1976 Broadway play by Michael Sawyer
 Best Friends (professional wrestling), a professional wrestling tag team
 Best Friends Animal Society, an animal welfare organization based in the United States

See also
 Best friends forever
 Best Fwends, a musical group from Texas
 Best Friend of Charleston, an early railroad locomotive
 Best of Friends (disambiguation)